Panic Room is the second studio album by Australian singer-songwriter and music producer Paul Mac. It was released in October 2005 and peaked at No. 39 in Australia.
The album was nominated for the "Best Dance Release" at the 2006 ARIA Music Awards, this is the award he won in 2002. The title refers to Paulmac's home studio where the album was recorded.

"I've been working on my new album for the past couple of years and I'm really excited it's finally about to released", says Mac. "I can't wait to bring this album alive on stage with the singers, the choir and my band".

Promotion
On 14 October Paul Mac appeared on Channel [V]'s "What U Want" and Rove Live.

On 29 September Paul Mac announced live performance throughout Australia. This was his first solo dates in over three years and featured multi-vocalists line up. The tour was called "The Paul Mac Experience".

 
Paul Mac also performed at Sydney's Homebake Festival on 3 December, Sydney's Good Vibrations Festival on 18 February 2006 and Great Escape Festival on 15 April.

Track listing

Charts

References

2005 albums
Eleven: A Music Company albums